The 1992 Philadelphia Wings season marked the team's sixth season of operation.

Game log
Reference:

(p) - denotes playoff game

Roster
Reference:

See also
 Philadelphia Wings
 1992 MILL season

References

Philadelphia Wings seasons
1992 in lacrosse
Philly